John James North  (26 July 1871 – 14 July 1950) was a New Zealand Baptist minister, editor and the first principal of the New Zealand Baptist Theological College. He was born in Dukinfield, Cheshire, England, in 1871.

He was appointed an Officer of the Order of the British Empire in the 1950 New Year Honours "for services to the Baptist organisation in New Zealand". His son Alfred was a lawyer and judge.

References

1871 births
1950 deaths
New Zealand Baptist ministers
New Zealand theologians
People from Dukinfield
English emigrants to New Zealand
New Zealand Officers of the Order of the British Empire